Oscar Eduardo Hernández Rios (born July 9, 1993) is a Venezuelan professional baseball catcher for the Trois-Rivières Aigles of the Frontier League. He previously played in Major League Baseball (MLB) for the Arizona Diamondbacks and Kansas City Royals.

Career

Tampa Bay Rays
Hernández signed with the Tampa Bay Rays as an international free agent in 2009. He made his professional debut with the Venezuelan Summer League Rays in 2010. In 2011, Hernández returned to the VSL Rays, slashing a torrid .402/.503/.732 with 21 home runs and 66 RBI in 69 games with the team. He was promoted to the Rookie-level Princeton Rays in 2012, where he hit .231/.349/.394 with 5 home runs and 24 RBI. He split the 2013 season between the Low-A Hudson Valley Renegades and the Single-A Bowling Green Hot Rods, accumulating a .227/.286/.364 slash line in 46 games between the two teams. He returned to Bowling Green for the 2014 season, posting a .249/.301/.401 slash line with 9 home runs and 63 RBI.

Arizona Diamondbacks
Hernández was selected by the Arizona Diamondbacks from the Rays with the first overall pick in the 2014 Rule 5 draft. Hernández began the 2015 season on the disabled list after breaking a bone in his left hand. He had a rehabilitation assignment in June with the Triple-A Reno Aces and the Single-A Kane County Cougars, then was activated to the Diamondbacks' MLB roster on July 4.

Hernández made his MLB debut on July 12, 2015, and appeared in 31 games for the 2015 Diamondbacks, batting .161/.257/.194. In 2016, he appeared in four MLB games with Arizona, batting .182 with one home run, which came on August 10 off of Jerry Blevins, helping the Diamondbacks defeat the New York Mets, 3−2, at Citi Field in 12 innings. His bulk of work in 2016 came in Double-A with the Mobile BayBears and in High-A with the Visalia Rawhide. He was assigned to the Double-A Jackson Generals to begin the 2017 season. On June 23, 2017, Hernández was designated for assignment by the Diamondbacks, removing him from their 40-man roster. He was outrighted to Jackson on June 27, and remained in Double-A to finish the year, logging a slash line of .197/.263/.352. He elected free agency on November 6, 2017.

Boston Red Sox
On January 8, 2018, Hernández signed a minor league contract with the Boston Red Sox organization. On March 23, 2018, he was suspended 50 games without pay, following a second positive test for a drug of abuse, in violation of the Minor League Drug Prevention and Treatment Program. He was activated from the restricted list at the end of May, and was assigned to the Triple-A Pawtucket Red Sox where he batted .205 with one home run and 14 RBIs in 47 games.

Hernández started the 2019 season with the Double-A Portland Sea Dogs, then was assigned to Triple-A Pawtucket in late April. He was selected to Boston's active MLB roster on May 17, when Sandy León was placed on the paternity list. Hernández was returned to Pawtucket on May 20, without making an appearance with Boston. For the 2019 MLB London Series at the end of June, Hernández traveled to London with the Red Sox as an extra player not on the active roster, in case of injury. He was designated for assignment by the Red Sox on July 2, in order to open a spot on the 40-man roster for Trevor Kelley. The team sent Hernández outright to Pawtucket the next day. Overall with Portland and Pawtucket in 2019, Hernández appeared in 54 minor league games, batting .192 with six home runs and 21 RBIs. He elected free agency on October 1.

St. Louis Cardinals
On January 7, 2020, Hernández signed a minor league deal with the St. Louis Cardinals organization. On May 27, Hernández was released by the Cardinals.

Kansas City Royals
On July 9, 2020, Hernandez signed a minor league contract with the Kansas City Royals. On July 23, 2020, Hernandez was selected to the 40-man and active rosters. He was designated for assignment on August 2 after going 2-for-4 in 4 games with the Royals and outrighted on August 5. On October 15, 2020, Hernandez elected free agency.

Toros de Tijuana
On June 24, 2021, Hernández signed with the Toros de Tijuana of the Mexican League. Hernández hit .244/.279/.366 with 1 home run and 4 RBI in 14 games with Tijuana before he was released on July 20.

Trois-Rivières Aigles
On January 11, 2023, Hernández signed with the Trois-Rivières Aigles of the Frontier League.

See also
 List of Major League Baseball players from Venezuela

References

External links

1993 births
Living people
Arizona Diamondbacks players
Bowling Green Hot Rods players
Hudson Valley Renegades players
Jackson Generals (Southern League) players
Kane County Cougars players
Kansas City Royals players
Leones del Caracas players
Major League Baseball catchers
Major League Baseball players from Venezuela
Mobile BayBears players
People from Falcón
Pawtucket Red Sox players
Portland Sea Dogs players
Princeton Rays players
Reno Aces players
Salt River Rafters players
Baseball players suspended for drug offenses
Venezuelan expatriate baseball players in the United States
Venezuelan Summer League Rays players
Visalia Rawhide players